The Bayside Bridge is a girder bridge in Pinellas County which crosses over the northwesternmost end of Tampa Bay, connecting Clearwater, Florida and Largo, Florida. Construction began in the early 1990s and was completed in the summer of 1993, officially opening for traffic on June 2 of that year. Originally conceived in the 1970s as the 49th Street Bridge, a toll-levied part of the  Pinellas Parkway, the current six-lane twin-span bridge provides direct, unmitigated access from eastern Clearwater to St. Petersburg/Clearwater International Airport by connecting McMullen Booth Road to 49th Street North and also serves as a bypass for heavily congested US 19.

The speed limit is 55 mph (or about 88 km/h) until McMullen Booth. Due to cambering differences, cars experience bouncing when traveling in the northbound lanes. This occurs for the first (southern) half of the northbound span.

It features a SPUI interchange at State Road 60 and a diamond interchange on the south end of the bridge. Along with the bridge, a $12 million interchange was built at the intersection of 49th Street and Roosevelt Boulevard. The bridge was completed before McMullen Booth Road was widened, dumping up to 36,000 cars a day onto the two-lane road. On streets such as Marlo Road, drivers could wait as long as 15 minutes before being able to make a left turn.

In 1991, Pinellas County administrator Fred Marquis argued that the cost of the bridge could be funded by a 10-year extension of gasoline taxes. The plan went through as the "Penny for Pinellas" tax. This eliminated the need for a planned $2.5 million, 16-lane toll booth that would have been built on sensitive marshlands at the south end of the bridge. The cost of construction of the bridge is estimated at $71 million.

The plan is for the Bayside Bridge to connect to nearby Interstate 275 via the Gateway Expressway that started construction in August 2017.

References

External links
 County Road 296 Connection Project at Tampa Bay Interstates site

Bridges completed in 1993
Bridges in Pinellas County, Florida
Buildings and structures in Clearwater, Florida
Buildings and structures in Largo, Florida
Road bridges in Florida
Bridges over Tampa Bay
1993 establishments in Florida
Cantilever bridges in the United States